James Patrick Buckley (born 14 August 1987) is an English actor, musician, YouTuber and streamer. He is best known for playing Jay Cartwright in the E4 sitcom The Inbetweeners.

Early life and education
James Patrick Buckley was born in Croydon, England. His father was a postman and his mother worked for the Home Office. It was while taking part in school plays that Buckley found out how much he enjoyed performing and, from the age of seven, started going to a stage school at weekends. The family later moved to Dagenham and by the age of eleven, Buckley began his first professional jobs in the West End shows Whistle Down the Wind and Les Misérables. The same year, he also began attending The Chafford School. Buckley stated that school interested him so little that he did not collect his GCSE results.

Career
Buckley's first role was in 2001 as Johnny Vaughan's twelve-year-old godson in the BBC sitcom 'Orrible. He then appeared in a Hellmann's advertisement in 2004 and in a 2005 music video for the Gravenhurst track 'I Turn My Face To The Forest Floor' directed by Ralitza Petrova. His stage credits include the West End musical Les Misérables as Gavroche and Whistle Down the Wind as Clarence. As well as The Inbetweeners and Rock & Chips, Buckley's other credits include an episode of Skins and episodes of The Bill, Holby City and Teachers.

He also played the character of Fred in Off the Hook. For Red Nose Day 2011, Buckley and his Inbetweeners co-stars went on a "rude road trip" and visited the rudest street names in the United Kingdom in 50 hours. In April 2011, Buckley received a BAFTA nomination for his role in The Inbetweeners. Buckley played the main character in the short film Veronique. Buckley appears in the 2011 film Everywhere and Nowhere. That same year, Buckley reprised his role as Jay Cartwright in the film, The Inbetweeners Movie, and its sequel, The Inbetweeners 2 in 2014.

In 2014, Buckley starred in an American horror film called The Pyramid, playing cameraman Fitzie.

In April 2016, Buckley started a YouTube gaming channel called Completed It Mate — a reference to The Inbetweeners episode "Will's Dilemma" — which has over 428,000 subscribers as of September 2021. He moved to Twitch under the same name. Since beginning his channel, Buckley has collaborated with other YouTubers, most notably with the Rooster Teeth group Achievement Hunter, when he appeared on their Off Topic Podcast and multiple episodes of their Let's Play series. He has also appeared on Alternative Lifestyle, a YouTube series created by Sugar Pine 7, another Rooster Teeth subsidiary.

From 2017 to 2019, Buckley played the role of double-glazing salesman Brian Fitzpatrick in the BBC Two sitcom White Gold.

In 2020, he starred in the Doctor Who episode "Orphan 55", in which he played Nevi.

In March 2020, Buckley appeared as a contestant on an episode of The Great Celebrity Bake Off for SU2C, alongside Patsy Palmer, Richard Dreyfuss and Scarlett Moffatt, in which he won.

Buckley does voice-overs. He worked with AllAboutCareers.com to produce an explanatory animation for the website. Buckley is also the narrator on E4's show Little Box of Horrors. He starred in the music video for States of Emotion's track "The Unsung", and also features on backing vocals and guitar on Steve Cradock's album Peace City West. In 2012, Buckley made his directorial debut, where he directed and starred in a music video for the Essex band The Milk.

Buckley has appeared in commercials for Orange, with the cast of The Expendables 2, Game, and bookmaker Ladbrokes, as well as providing voice-over for Envirofone, Trunki and Hastings Direct. In 2020, Oldham Council commissioned Buckley to produce a Cameo video message outlining safety measures put in place by the council to help stop the spread of coronavirus.

In the latter end of 2021, Buckley was announced to be playing the part of Ben in the stage play 2:22: A Ghost Story, taking over the role from Jake Wood in its move to the Gielgud Theatre.

Personal life 
Buckley is a Twitch streamer and YouTuber under the channel names Completed It Mate and At Home With The Buckleys, the former of which is a reference to a line that his character Jay says in an episode of The Inbetweeners.

Buckley married Clair Meek in 2012. They originally bonded over their shared obsession with the Beatles, particularly George Harrison, their shared favourite. They have two children.

He is a supporter of Crystal Palace F.C.

Filmography

Film

Television

Theatre

References

External links

 
 
 
 
 
 Interview With Simon Bird and James Buckley profile, The British Comedy Guide
 

1987 births
Living people
21st-century English male actors
English male television actors
English male musical theatre actors
English male child actors
English male comedians
People from Croydon
Male actors from London
English YouTubers
YouTubers from London
Twitch (service) streamers